Rubber hose or Rubberhose may refer to:

 A hose, a flexible hollow tube
 Rubber hose animation, the first animation style that became standardized in the American animation industry
 Rubberhose (file system), a deniable encryption archive containing multiple file systems whose existence can only be verified using the appropriate cryptographic key
 Rubber-hose cryptanalysis, a euphemism for the extraction of cryptographic secrets from a person by coercion or torture

See also
 Rubber (disambiguation)
 Hose (disambiguation)